Thomas Henry Sargent (21 November 1894 – 7 May 1963), known professionally by his stage name Max Miller and billed as The Cheeky Chappie, was an English comedian often considered the greatest stand-up of his generation. He came from humble beginnings and left school at the age of twelve. At the outbreak of the First World War, he volunteered for the army. During his time in the forces, he started a troupe concert party. On leaving the army, he took up work as a light comedian, dancer, and singer. He toured extensively, appearing in variety, revues and by the early 1930s reached the top of the bill in the large music halls including the London Palladium.

He recorded many songs, some of which he wrote. He appeared frequently on radio and starred in fourteen feature films. He was known for his flamboyant suits, his wicked charm, and his risqué jokes often led to difficulties with the censors. He made his last recording in January 1963 and died four months later.

Early years
Miller was born as Thomas Henry Sargent on 21 November 1894 in Hereford Street, Kemptown, Brighton, Sussex.  He was the second child of James Sargent, a labourer, and Alice (née West), a flower seller; Miller had three brothers and two sisters. His parents were poor and often unable to pay rent, so were forced to move to other parts of the town. Owing to this, Miller frequently changed schools, until he reached 12 when he left altogether. He tried jobs such as labouring, delivering milk, selling fish and chips, caddying at the Brighton and Hove Golf Course, and finally trained to be a motor mechanic. As a youth, he was nicknamed "Swanky Sargent".

On the outbreak of the war in 1914, Miller volunteered for the army. He joined the Royal Sussex Regiment and, after serving in France, was posted to India and a year later to Mesopotamia, where he was temporarily blinded for three days. This experience stayed with him all his life, and in later years he did much work to help the blind including giving his home in Brighton over to St Dunstans during World War 2. During his time in the army, he started a troops' concert party.

Career

Early performing experiences

Demobilised from the army, Miller found work to be in short supply, and he had lost his mother to the 1918 flu pandemic. He had his sights on performing in London, and obtained a booking at the Shoreditch Hall in 1919. He was not experienced enough for the type of venue, however, and lasted only a week. Returning to Brighton, he saw an advertisement for artists to join Jack Sheppard's concert party in an alfresco theatre on Brighton beach. He applied and joined as a light comedian for the 1919 summer season. While with the concert party, he met his future wife, Frances Kathleen Marsh, who was a contralto in the group.

Kathleen Marsh came from a middle-class family whose parents came to Brighton from Dorset shortly before she was born in 1896. Her elder brother Ernest Marsh served as a Brighton alderman for 43 years and became mayor of the then town from 1949 to 1950.

In the summer of 1920, Harry toured nationwide in The Rogues, a concert party. The following year, Harry and Kathleen toured in a revue called The Girl. While in Plymouth, the couple married at the parish church in Tormoham, Devon on 17 February 1921. (Tormoham is better known today as Torre in the seaside resort of Torquay.) As well as being a performer, Kathleen was an astute businesswoman, and thereafter did much to develop her husband's career. She suggested that he should change his name to Max Miller. Later, a press notice described Max as the Cheeky Chappie, and the nickname stuck.

Max and Kathleen formed a double act for a while, but it became obvious to her that Max was the stronger performer and that he would be better as a solo act.

Apprenticeship

Through the 1920s, Miller was regularly touring in revues. In 1922 he was in a show presented by the Sydney Syndicate, There You Are Then. The following year, he toured with the Ernest Binn Arcadians. 1924 saw him joining a revue called Crisps. However, during that summer, he returned to Jack Sheppard's Concert Party on the Brighton seafront. In 1925, he continued in the revue Crisps, and in November that year joined the cast of Ten to One On, which starred Jimmy James. This show ran until February 1926, when Miller gained work in variety or cine-variety, the latter a show consisting half of film and half of live acts. In September, he was booked in the Holborn Empire, his first engagement there, where he was spotted by impresario Tom Arnold, who booked him to star in his next revue, Piccadilly. It opened in Birmingham and toured the country. His co-star was the 21-year-old Florence Desmond. After that, he was booked by Fred Karno to appear in The Show, and in May joined a touring cabaret revue called XYZ until the end of the year. After a few weeks in variety, he was back in revue, starring in Francis Laider's Tipperary Tim.

This kept him busy until February 1929, when he appointed a new agent, Julius Darewski. This was a turning point in his career. In May, Miller made his first appearance at the London Palladium in variety. He returned there in October and, in November, joined the cast of Fools in Paradise, which took him to March 1930. This would be his last revue for some time.

Miller much preferred to perform solo, and from 1930 onwards, he appeared in variety in large theatres, including the London Palladium and the Holborn Empire. In those days, instant success was unheard of, and Miller, like any other performer, had to earn his fame through a long apprenticeship. In May 1931, he appeared in his first Royal Variety Performance. Radio broadcasts followed.

In 1932, he made his first recording, Confessions of a Cheeky Chappie, on the Broadcast Twelve Records label. After this initial success, he was wooed by HMV and recorded for them. In 1953, he changed to Philips, and then to Pye.

Miller was given a cameo role in the film The Good Companions (1933) in the part of a music publisher selling a song to a pianist, played by John Gielgud. Although he was not credited for his role, his three-minute debut was impressive, got him noticed and led to his making a further 13 films working up from small parts to starring roles. Considered his best film, Educated Evans (1936), which was based on an Edgar Wallace story and filmed by Warner Bros., it has been lost. His last but one film was Hoots Mon! (1940). He played the part of a southern English comedian called Harry Hawkins. In the film there is a scene in which Harry Hawkins appears on the stage in a variety theatre. The act is Miller's, and the sequence is the only one in existence giving us an idea of his stage act. It is invariably included in any documentary made about him.

Stardom

Miller's act on a variety bill usually lasted between 20 and 30 minutes. It would begin with the orchestra playing his signature tune, Mary from the Dairy. A spotlight aimed on the curtain by the wings would anticipate his appearance. There would be excitement in the audience; he would sometimes wait for up to ten seconds until he appeared, leading to resounding applause. Miller would walk to the microphone and just stand there in his costume, a colourful suit with plus-fours, a kipper tie, trilby and co-respondent shoes, and wait for the laughter to begin.

Although Miller's material was risqué, he never swore on stage and disapproved of those who did. He used double entendre, and when telling a joke would often leave out the last word or words for the audience to complete.

His act would be punctuated by songs: sentimental material like "My Old Mum", or comic numbers such as "Twin Sisters". Sometimes he would accompany himself on guitar or entertain with a soft shoe shuffle. He wrote and co-wrote a number of songs.

Miller was very much a southern English comedian. He preferred being booked in theatres in London or the south, so he could return to his beloved Brighton after a show. However, in 1932 he embarked on his only overseas tour, when he sailed to Cape Town to appear in Johannesburg and Pretoria, South Africa.

After many years as a solo act in variety, he appeared in George Black's wartime revue Haw Haw! at the Holborn Empire from December 1939 to July 1940. George Black's next revue, Apple Sauce, opened in August 1940 at the Holborn Empire, co-starring Vera Lynn. After the theatre was bombed, the show transferred to the London Palladium, where it ran until November 1941. After that, Miller was back touring in variety, and broke all records as the highest paid variety artist, earning £1,025 in a single week at the Coventry Hippodrome in February, 1943.

In 1947, he topped the bill in Bernard Delfont presents International Variety at the London Casino. In his review of the show, Daily Mail theatre critic Lionel Hale described Miller as the "gold of the music hall".

The comeback

Miller appeared in three Royal Variety Performances (1931, 1937 and 1950). In the last of these, he was annoyed that he was only given six minutes, while the American comedian Jack Benny got twenty minutes, so he abandoned his script and went on for twelve minutes, ending with riotous applause. However, this had a devastating effect on the schedule. Val Parnell, the producer, who ran the Moss Empires circuit of theatres, was furious, and told Miller that he would never work for him again.

Despite this, after eighteen months of Miller's touring in secondary theatres, he was invited back to the "number ones" – the Moss Empires – and returned in triumph to the London Palladium. One of these "number two" theatres was Hulme Hippodrome, where Ken Dodd said he appeared as a younger performer on the same bill as Max Miller in "about 1951, 1952". This return to the Palladium revitalised his career, and with it came a new recording contract, this time with Philips. He was back on radio and appeared on television, but his television appearances were never a great success. The new medium did not suit his style; he needed the feedback only a live theatre audience could give him and the freedom to use his naughty material.

Miller appeared regularly in all the large variety halls in and around London: the Hackney Empire, Chelsea Palace, Chiswick Empire, Finsbury Park Empire, Wood Green Empire and Metropolitan Music Hall. It was in the latter that he recorded the LP Max at the Met in 1957.

The final years

In 1958, Miller suffered a heart attack. After recovery, he needed to take life easier. His last West End appearance took place at the Palace Theatre in April 1959, and his last ever appearance in variety was in Folkestone in December 1960. Miller continued to make records, his last being in January 1963 with Lonnie Donegan.

Death
Miller died at home on 7 May 1963, aged 68, and was cremated at the Downs Crematorium, Brighton. A memorial tablet is mounted on a wall in the Garden of Remembrance. His wife Kathleen outlived him by nine years, dying in a Hove nursing home in 1972.

With dwindling work in variety, brought about by the rise of television, he had commented, "When I'm dead and gone, the game's finished."

It has frequently been suggested that John Osborne modelled the character Archie Rice in his play The Entertainer on Miller. John Osborne denied it and in his autobiography he wrote, "This is not so. Archie was a man. Max was a god, a saloon-bar Priapus".

Censorship
The laws on censorship were strict during Miller's lifetime. Those responsible for censorship were the Lord Chamberlain in London and local watch committees in the regions. Miller's material needed approval by those bodies but by using innuendo, leaving out the last word or words of a joke, he could get away with much risqué and saucy material. However, he never swore or told a "dirty joke" on stage.

In one of his acts he would take from his pocket two books, one a white book and the other a blue book, explaining to the audience that these are joke books and asking them which the audience would like; the crowd almost always chose the blue book. The jokes in the blue book were the naughty ones. For example:
I went skating the other week with a young lady on ice and we'd been going around for quite a while and she kept on falling down.I said, "Have you hurt yourself?”She said, "No, I'm sorry to spoil your fun".I said, "You're not spoiling my fun. It'll keep on ice".

Or he would leave the last word out for the audience to finish and blamed them if they laughed.
When roses are red,They're ready for plucking.When a girl is sixteen,She's ready for ... 'Ere 

He would then say, "I know exactly what you are saying to yourself, you're wrong, I know what you're saying. You wicked lot. You're the sort of people that get me a bad name!"

It was said that Miller was banned by the BBC twice, first in the 1930s, and then in the 1950s. However, these rumours only helped Miller's reputation as daring and naughty, and led to increased box office sales.

Legacy

Miller influenced many comedians during his lifetime and since. His jokes live on and are often told by other comedians. The comedian Walter William Bygraves became known as Max Bygraves after his impersonation of Miller. Miller was one of the many famous people on the cover of the Beatles' "Sgt. Pepper's Lonely Hearts Club Band".

The biography, Max Miller the Cheeky Chappie by John M. East was published in 1977. A paperback version was issued in 1993 with additional material. Two paperbacks containing Miller's jokes have been published: The Max Miller Blue Book compiled by Barry Took and illustrated by cartoonist Trog (1975) and The Max Miller Appreciation Society's Blue Book compiled by members with a foreword by Roy Hudd (2001).

Several radio and television documentaries have been produced including Gerald Scarfe's The Girls Who Do (40 Minutes, BBC, 1989) and Heroes of Comedy: Max Miller (1995). Here's a Funny Thing, a play featuring John Bardon by R.W. Shakespeare, was staged at the Edinburgh Fringe, and at the Fortune Theatre in London; it was broadcast on Channel Four in November 1982.

In 1999, the Max Miller Appreciation Society was formed in Brighton. Its main purpose is to keep his memory alive. It has erected a bronze statue sculptured by Peter Webster in the Royal Pavilion Gardens, New Road, Brighton (unveiled 1 May 2005; re-sited August 2007) and mounted two blue plaques on his former homes on Ashcroft in Kingston Lane, Shoreham-by-Sea (2000) and at 160 Marine Parade, Brighton (2006). In 2009, the Society curated an exhibition devoted to Miller's life and career in Bardsley's Fish Restaurant, Baker Street, Brighton.

In the British drama The Triple Echo from 1972, set during World War II, Glenda Jackson and Brian Deacon are listening to him (and laughing aloud) on the radio. He's telling a story about finding a man without any clothes on, standing in his house, and his wife said he's a nudist who came to use the phone.

Catchphrases

He was renowned for his use of catchphrases, in performance
"Now, there's a funny thing"
Where's me washboard?
How queer
I've seen you wrapping presents when it's nobody's birthday
"Listen! Listen!"
"There'll never be another"
"They don't make 'em anymore, duck!"
"It's people like you who give me a bad name"
"It's all clever stuff, no rubbish!"
"How's your memory, gal?"
"Miller's the name, Lady"
"I don't care what I say, do I?"
"That's nice, Maxie"
"You can't help liking him"
" 'Ere!"

Filmography

Discography
 Oct 1932	Confessions of a Cheeky Chappie, pts 1 and 2: 78 rpm Broadcast Twelve 3266
 Oct 1935	Confessions of a Cheeky Chappie, pts 1 and 2: 	78 rpm	Rex 8604
 Mar 1935	Max the Auctioneer, pts 1 and 2:	78 rpm	Rex 8665
 Dec 1936	Mary from the Dairy/ The Woman Improver:	78 rpm	HMV BD385
 Jan 1937	Ophelia/Down in the Valley:	78 rpm	HMV BD396
 Jan 1937	Backscratcher/Impshe: 78 rpm	HMV BD408
 Feb 1937	Why Should the Dustman Get It All? /You Can't Blame Me for That:	78 rpm	HMV BD417
 May 1937	How the So and So Can I Be Happy? /The Girl Next Door:	78 rpm	HMV BD419
 Jun 1937	The Love Bug Will Bite You/Julietta:	78 rpm	HMV BD427
 Jul 1937	You Can't Go Away Like That/Weeping Willow:	78 rpm	HMV BD432
 Sep 1937	The Windmill/La De Da:	78 rpm	HMV BD439
 Oct 1937	Put It Down/The Old Oak Tree:	78 rpm	HMV BD450
 Nov 1937	I Never Thought That She'd Do That To Me/Let's All Have a Charabanc Ride:	78 rpm	HMV BD458
 Mar 1937	Voice of the Stars extracts from the film Don't Get Me Wrong:	78 rpm	VS4
 Dec 1937	Just Another Sally/The Christmas Dinner:	78 rpm	HMV BD475
 Jan 1938	Annie the Farmer's Daughter/Ain't Love Grand?:	78 rpm	HMV BD482
 Mar 1938	She Said She Wouldn't/I'm the Only Bit of Comfort She's Got:	78 rpm	HMV BD505
 Apr 1938	Winnie the Whistler/Doh Rae Me:	78 rpm	HMV BD533
 May 1938	Every Sunday Afternoon/Um Ta Ra Rae:	78 rpm	HMV BD541
 Jul 1938	Does She Still Remember? /I Bought a Horse:	78 rpm	HMV BD563
 Sep 1938	The Girls Who Work Where I Work/Happy School Days:	78 rpm	HMV BD583  
 Nov 1938	She Was She Was She Was/Just in Fun:	78 rpm	HMV BD597
 Dec 1938	Max Miller in the Theatre: At the Holborn Empire:	78 rpm	HMV BD615
 Dec 1938	Max Miller in the Theatre: At the Holborn Empire:	78 rpm	HMV BD616
 Dec 1938	Max Miller in the Theatre: At the Holborn Empire:	78 rpm	HMV BD617
 Mar 1939	Max Miller in the Theatre Again: Holborn Empire: Second House:	78 rpm	HMV BD646
 Mar 1939	Max Miller in the Theatre Again: Holborn Empire: Second House:	78 rpm	HMV BD647
 Mar 1939	Max Miller in the Theatre Again: Holborn Empire: Second House:	78 rpm	HMV BD648
 Jun 1939	At the Bathing Parade/Everything Happens to Me	78 rpm	HMV BD697
 Jul 1939	No, No, No/Maria Fell for Me:	78 rpm	HMV BD710
 Dec 1939	Max Miller in the Theatre: At the Finsbury Park Empire:	78 rpm	HMV BD770
 Dec 1939	Max Miller in the Theatre: At the Finsbury Park Empire:	78 rpm	HMV BD771
 Dec 1939	Max Miller in the Theatre: At the Finsbury Park Empire:	78 rpm	HMV BD772
 Dec 1940	Max Miller with the Forces (Somewhere in England):	78 rpm	HMV BD883
 Dec 1940	Max Miller with the Forces (Somewhere in England):	78 rpm	HMV BD884
 Dec 1940	Max Miller with the Forces (Somewhere in England):	78 rpm	HMV BD885
 Dec 1941	Max Miller Entertains the War Workers:	78 rpm	HMV BD980
 Dec 1941	Max Miller Entertains the War Workers:	78 rpm	HMV BD981
 Dec 1941	Max Miller Entertains the War Workers:	78 rpm	HMV BD982
 Jan 1942	That's the Way to Fall in Love/When You're Feeling Lonely/She'll Never Be the Same Again:	78 rpm	HMV BD987
 Nov 1942	Max Miller in the Theatre: At the Finsbury Park Empire:	78 rpm	HMV BD1022
 Nov 1942	Max Miller in the Theatre: At the Finsbury Park Empire:	78 rpm	HMV BD1023
 Mar 1950	Come Hither with Your Zither/ I Never See Maggie Alone:	78 rpm	HMV BD9878
 Dec 1953	Let's Have a Ride on Your Bicycle/My Old Mum:	78 rpm	Philips PB199
 Mar 1954	Mary from the Dairy/ Voulez Vous Promenade?:	78 rpm	Philips PB236
 Apr 1954	Pleasant Dreams/Oh Yes! She Knows Her Onions: (with the Beverley Sisters)	78 rpm	Philips PB274
 Jun 1954	Friends and Neighbours/Two Little People:	78 rpm	Philips PB296
 Nov 1954	Someone Else I'd Like to Be/Don't Forget Your First Sweetheart:	78 rpm	Philips PB362
 Apr 1955	Something Money Can't Buy/London Belongs to Me:	78 rpm	Philips PB427
 Oct 1955	The Budgie Song/Ain't It Ni-ice!:	78 rpm	Philips PB518
 May 1956	The Girls I Like/The Mother Brown Story:	78 rpm	Nixa N15050
 Nov 1957	Max at the Met (recorded at The Metropolitan Music Hall, London):	LP	Nixa NPT19026
 Jun 1958	Be Sincere/With a Little Bit of Luck:	78 rpm	Nixa N15141
 Jun 1961	Influence/There's Always Someone Worse Off Than You:	45 rpm	Pye 7N15349
 Jun 1961	That's Nice Maxie (recorded at the Black Lion, Patcham, Brighton):	LP	Pye NPL18064
 Sep 1962	The Cheeky Chappie (recorded at the Star Sound Studios, London):	LP	Pye NPL18079
 Jan 1963	The Market Song/Tit Bits: with Lonnie Donegan	45 rpm	Pye 7N 15493
			
	Since these recordings were released, most have been re-issues as compilations on LPs, cassettes and CDs)

Notes

References
Fisher, John (1973), Funny Way to be a Hero, London, Muller, pp. 86–96, 
East, John M. (1977), Max Miller the Cheeky Chappie, London, W H Allen,  
Osborne, John (1981), A Better Class of Person: An Autobiography: 1929-1956, London, Dutton, pp. 203–205, 
Wilmot, Roger (1986), Kindly Leave the Stage: The Story of Variety 1919-1960 Methuen, pp. 122–125,  
Baker, Richard Anthony (2011), Old Time Variety: An Illustrated History Barnsley, Remember When, pp. 52–59,

External links

Max Miller, Great Lives, BBC Radio 4, first broadcast 15 August 2006.

1894 births
1963 deaths
20th-century English comedians
20th-century English male actors
Comedians from Sussex
British male comedy actors
English comedy musicians
English male comedians
English male film actors
English male stage actors
English radio personalities
Male actors from Brighton
Music hall performers
British novelty song performers